1998 is a year.

1998 may also refer to:
1998 (number)
"1998" (instrumental), a track by Binary Finary
"1998" (Chet Faker song), 2014